Uriah Shelton (born March 10, 1997) is an American actor and singer. He is known for his television roles, such as playing Jeff Cargill on The Glades, Josh on the web series Blue, and Joshua Matthews on Girl Meets World. Shelton was also the lead in the 2010 film Lifted.

Early life
Shelton was born in Dallas, Texas, and has also lived in Magnolia Springs, Alabama. He took a modeling class at the age of 7, which led to the start of his acting career in television commercials. Shelton is also involved in mixed martial arts.

Career
Shelton has starred in television shows, including: Without a Trace, The Ghost Whisperer, Mad TV, Dirty Sexy Money, The Suite Life on Deck, Monk, Trust Me, Trauma, Hallmark's The Nanny Express, and the independent feature Alabama Moon.

Shelton starred in the lead role of Henry Matthews in the movie Lifted. Shelton wrote and sang the song "I Miss You," in the movie. He played the recurring role of Joshua Matthews on Disney Channel's Girl Meets World, sequel series of the 1990s sitcom Boy Meets World.

Shelton also appeared in the A&E drama The Glades (2010-2013). He played Jeff Cargill, the son of a nurse played by Kiele Sanchez. In 2020, he portrayed the love interest of Kathryn Newton's lead character in the well-reviewed horror comedy film Freaky.

Filmography

Film

Television and web

References

External links

1997 births
Living people
American male child actors
American male television actors
American male film actors
American wushu practitioners
Male actors from Dallas
21st-century American male actors